Wildfire, also known as Wildfire: The Story of a Horse in the United Kingdom, is a 1945 American Cinecolor Western film directed by Robert Emmett Tansey and starring Bob Steele.

It was an early film production from Robert L. Lippert.

Cast 
Bob Steele as "Happy" Haye
Sterling Holloway as "Alkali" Jones
John Miljan as Pete Fanning
Eddie Dean as Sheriff Johnny Deal
Virginia Maples as Judy Gordon
Sarah Padden as Aunt Agatha
Gene Alsace as Henchman Buck Perry
Francis Ford as Ezra Mills
William Farnum as Judge Polson
William 'Wee Willie' Davis as Henchman Moose Harris

Soundtrack 
 Eddie Dean – "On the Banks of the Sunny San Juan" (Written by Glenn Strange and Eddie Dean)
 Eddie Dean – "By the Sleepy Rio Grande"

References

External links 

1945 films
1940s English-language films
1945 Western (genre) films
Films about horses
Cinecolor films
American Western (genre) films
Lippert Pictures films
Films directed by Robert Emmett Tansey
1940s American films